Newtonian refers to the work of Isaac Newton, in particular:
 Newtonian mechanics, i.e. classical mechanics
 Newtonian telescope, a type of reflecting telescope
 Newtonian cosmology
 Newtonian dynamics
 Newtonianism, the philosophical principle of applying Newton's methods in a variety of fields
 Newtonian fluid, a fluid that flows like water—its shear stress is linearly proportional to the velocity gradient in the direction perpendicular to the plane of shear
 Non-Newtonian fluids, in which the viscosity changes with the applied shear force

Supplementary material
 List of things named after Isaac Newton